Maulwi Sakhaullah is an  Afghan Taliban politician who is currently serving as Deputy Minister of Education of the Islamic Emirate of Afghanistan since 4 October 2021 alongside Saeed Ahmad Shahid Khel.

References

Living people
Taliban government ministers of Afghanistan
Year of birth missing (living people)